Raniganj Girl's College, established in 1980, is a college for girl students at Raniganj in Asansol, Paschim Bardhaman district. It offers undergraduate courses in arts, commerce and science. It is affiliated to Kazi Nazrul University, Asansol.  The college is recognized by the University Grants Commission (UGC) under sections 2f and 12B of the UGC Act 1956.

Departments

Science
Chemistry
Physics
Mathematics
Botany
Zoology
Microbiology
Geography
Economics
Nutrition

Arts 
Bengali
English
Sanskrit
Hindi
Urdu (Post Graduate Department)
Santhali
Education
Physical Education
History
Political Science
Philosophy
Psychology
Sociology

Performing Arts
Classical Vocal
Nazrulgeeti

Commerce
Accountancy
Finance
Taxation

Accreditation
Raniganj Girls' College is accredited by the National Assessment and Accreditation Council (NAAC), Bangalore as a B+ category institution. The first cycle of assessment and accreditation was done by NAAC in September 2016.

See also

References

External links
Raniganj Girl's College
Kazi Nazrul University
University Grants Commission
National Assessment and Accreditation Council

Women's universities and colleges in West Bengal
Universities and colleges in Paschim Bardhaman district
Colleges affiliated to Kazi Nazrul University
Education in Asansol
Educational institutions established in 1980
1980 establishments in West Bengal